Raoul Danniel Abellar Manuel (born August 30, 1994) is a Filipino youth activist and politician who is the representative for Kabataan Party-list. He is currently the National President of Kabataan Partylist, previously serving as the president of the National Union of Students of the Philippines. He is a member of the Philippine House of Representatives for the 19th Congress.

Education 

Manuel finished his undergraduate degree of Applied Mathematics in University of the Philippines Visayas and became its first Summa Cum Laude.

He became UPV College of Arts and Sciences Student Council Chairperson. After which, in 2016, he became the student regent of the Board of Regents of the University of the Philippines System where he represented 50,000 students.

Advocacies 

Raoul is an education advocate. He called for free education among public tertiary schools and the junking of the socialized tuition system in UP. He criticized the removal of Philippine History among senior high curriculums after housemates from Pinoy Big Brother failed to answer basic questions on Philippine history. He called for the review and overhaul of the K–12 system in the Philippines. He also criticized the state of education in the Philippines under the COVID-19 pandemic under the Duterte administration, saying that the shortcomings revealed the 'long-standing' problems of Philippine education. He became a National Convener for Rise for Education, an alliance that pushes through with nationalist, scientific, and mass-oriented Philippine education.

He has also been an advocate against mandatory implementation of Reserve Officers' Training Corps (ROTC) program in the Philippines as well as a critic of said abuses under the Armed Forces of the Philippines. During a Senate hearing on ROTC on August 22, 2019, he had a heated exchange with Senator Ronald 'Bato' dela Rosa.

During the filing for the nominees for the 2022 national elections, Manuel, as the first nominee of Kabataan Partylist, said that "The youth bear a responsibility to advance the politics of change and hope." He also said that Kabataan Partylist prevailed despite moves to disqualify them from Congress and denounced groups that "pretend" to be the voice of the youth.

In March 2022, a navy officer was condemned by Raoul in social media in which the said soldier posted death threats against the youth activist. The Philippine Navy said that the officer was relieved and became a subject of 'thorough investigation'.

He opposed both registrations of SIM cards and social media accounts.

Political career

Congressional career 
Entering congress at the age of 27, Manuel became one of the youngest members of the 19th Congress. He abstained during the election of the speakership and joined the minority bloc.

Electoral history 

Manuel was Kabataan's first nominee in the 2022 Philippine House of Representatives elections. The party-list received 536,690 votes or 1.46% of the votes, entitling the party a seat in congress. Throughout the campaign, the party was faced with disqualification cases, posing a risk to its proclamation. Nonetheless, the party was proclaimed as one of the winners of the party-list elections. Manuel, as the first nominee was designated as the party's representative in congress.

References

External links 

 

1994 births
People from Iloilo
Living people
Youth activists
University of the Philippines alumni